Kamlesh Kumar (born 26 December 1992) is an Indian cricketer. He made his List A debut on 25 September 2019, for Bihar in the 2019–20 Vijay Hazare Trophy.

References

External links
 

1992 births
Living people
Indian cricketers
Bihar cricketers
Place of birth missing (living people)